Fadhil Rassoul (Kurdish: فازیل ڕەسوڵ) born 1947 and died 13 July 1989, was an academic at the University of Vienna. He was born in Slemani, Kurdistan Region and was assassinated by the Iranian government in Vienna together with Abdul Rahman Ghassemlou while acting as mediator.

In the late 1970s he moves from Kurdistan to Beirut and works at a center called Center for Palestinian Studies. In 1980 he moves to Vienna where he complets his PhD in 1985. At the time of his assassination he was the editor of Algerian magazine El Hiwar (The Dialogue) by Ahmed Ben Bella, former president of Algeria who is also reported as a friend of his.

He is better known amongst Arabic readers as his works are in Arabic. He is best known for his book titled "This is how Ali Shariati spoke" written in Arabic. He is said to have completed his PhD in Berlin in 1985  with the title: "Superpower Policy and Freedom Struggle - Kurdistan and Soviet Middle East Policy" and also reported as being a researcher at "Austrian Institute of International Relations" and in other sources as a freelancer at the same institute. He is known to have been a left leaning academic but goes through a radical change to become a moderate Islamist and starts befriending Islamic scholars.

References 

Kurdish politicians
Assassinated Kurdish politicians
1947 births
1989 deaths